Cégep de Shawinigan is a public college located in Shawinigan, Quebec, Canada.

Originally known as the Cégep de Shawinigan at its founding in 1968, it was renamed to Collège Shawinigan in 1994 before returning to its original name in 2019.  In addition to the main campus in Shawinigan, there is a campus in La Tuque (CEC La Tuque).

See also
 Education in Quebec

References

External links
  in French

Colleges in Quebec
Shawinigan
Buildings and structures in Shawinigan
Education in Mauricie